United States v. Texas (Docket 22–58) is a pending United States Supreme Court case related to federal immigration law.

Background 

Many of the Biden administration's immigration policies have been subject to protracted litigation. Shortly after taking office in January 2021, the administration issued new enforcement guidelines to account for the lack of resources to deport every illegal immigrant present in the country at once. Texas filed a lawsuit in the United States District Court for the Southern District of Texas soon after, and Judge Drew B. Tipton issued a temporary restraining order. The state soon dismissed the lawsuit, but filed a new suit with Louisiana in April 2021 after the administration issued modified interim guidance in February. Judge Tipton then issued a preliminary injunction in August 2021. The government appealed to the United States Court of Appeals for the Fifth Circuit, which stayed the injunction in part in September. In November, the 5th Circuit, sitting en banc, vacated the panel opinion. That appeal became moot as the administration had issued a final guidance document in September. 

The court held a bench trial in February 2022 about the legality of the final guidance. On June 10, 2022, the court held the final guidance violated the Administrative Procedure Act, and vacated it. On July 6, 2022, a panel of the Fifth Circuit denied a stay pending appeal, holding the Supreme Court's intervening decision in Garland v. Gonzalez did not deprive the district court of jurisdiction over the suit.

Arizona, Montana, and Ohio separately challenged the permanent guidance in the United States District Court for the Southern District of Ohio. On March 22, 2022, Judge Michael J. Newman issued a preliminary injunction against the guidance, which the United States Court of Appeals for the Sixth Circuit stayed on April 12, 2022, and reversed on July 5, 2022.

Supreme Court 

After the 5th Circuit denied a stay pending appeal, the federal government sought a stay from the Supreme Court on July 8, 2022. On July 21, 2022, the court denied the application for stay in a 5–4 vote, but granted certiorari before judgment and set the case for argument in the December sitting.

References

External links 
 

2023 in United States case law
United States Supreme Court cases
United States Supreme Court cases of the Roberts Court
United States immigration and naturalization case law